Hoplopleura hirsuta is a sucking louse that is known from North, Central, and South America. Its main hosts are cotton rats such as Sigmodon hispidus, Sigmodon ochrognathus, Sigmodon peruanus, and Sigmodon arizonae.

References

Literature cited
Durden, L.A. and Musser, G.G. 1994. The sucking lice (Insecta, Anoplura) of the world: a taxonomic checklist with records of mammalian hosts and geographical distributions. Bulletin of the American Museum of Natural History 218:1–90.

Lice
Insects of Central America
Insects described in 1916